John Munro (14 April 1893 – 8 May 1917) was a Scottish professional footballer who played as a full back in the Scottish League for Aberdeen.

Personal life 
Munro served as a gunner in the Royal Field Artillery during the First World War and was killed on the Western Front on 8 May 1917. He was buried in Anzin-Saint Aubin British Cemetery.

Career statistics

References 

Scottish footballers
1917 deaths
British Army personnel of World War I
British military personnel killed in World War I
Royal Field Artillery soldiers
Scottish Football League players
Aberdeen East End F.C. players
People from Ross and Cromarty
Association football fullbacks
Aberdeen F.C. players
1893 births